Mason Hill are a Scotttish hard rock band, from Glasgow, who formed in 2015. Coined by schoolmates Scott Taylor and James Bird in 2013 they added Craig McFetridge to the line up and in due course Matthew Ward joined ranks followed shortly after by Marc Montgomery to complete the band.

They have released one studio album to date, Against The Wall (2021) plus an acoustic EP Unplugged (2020), which followed their debut EP, Mason Hill (2015).

History
Singer Scott Taylor and guitarist James Bird met at school.  Bird was already an accomplished guitarist, having played on stage with boyhood hero Zakk Wylde.  The band was formed in 2013 with the others joining at that time, with Taylor forgoing plans to become an Olympic swimmer and bassist Matthew Ward pulling out of his degree.  They released their debut eponymous EP in 2015 before embarking on various live shows, supporting acts such as Airbourne and Gun as well as appearing at festivals such as WinterStorm in Troon, and on the Boardie Takeover Stage at Download Festival.

In 2019, they launched a Kickstarter campaign for their debut album Against The Wall.  It was eventually released in March 2021 with the album reaching number 19 in the UK Albums Chart, and number one in the UK Rock and Metal Chart.

Members
Current lineup
Scott Taylor - Vocals
James Bird - Lead guitar
Marc Montgomery - Guitar
Matthew Ward - Bass
Craig McFetridge - Drums

Discography

Singles
 2020 "Against The Wall"
 2020 "Find My Way"
 2021 "DNA"

Albums
 Against The Wall (7 Hz, 2021)

EPs
 Mason Hil (2015)
 Unplugged (2020)

References

Scottish heavy metal musical groups